Topi is a tehsil of district Swabi in the Khyber Pakhtunkhwa province of Pakistan. It is administratively subdivided into twenty Union Councils, namely:

(1) Topi East, (2)Topi West, (3)Batakara, (4)Zarobai, (5)Kalabat, (6)Kotha, (7)Maini, (8)Gahbasni, (9)Gandaf, (10)Gani Chatra,  (11)Kabgani.

References

Tehsils of Khyber Pakhtunkhwa
Swabi District
Populated places in Swabi District